Government House is the office and official residence of the Administrator of the Northern Territory in Darwin, Australia. Built between 1870 and 1871, with later renovations between 1878 and 1879, the building is set on 13,000 square metres of hillside gardens in the centre of the Darwin business district, on The Esplanade.

History
Government House is the oldest European building in the Northern Territory. Government House has been the home of successive Government Residents and Administrators since 1871. The house is an example of a mid-Victorian Gothic villa, here adapted for the local climate by the addition of numerous shaded verandahs and porches. It has endured cyclones, earthquakes, enemy bombing raids, infestations of white ants and rowdy public demonstrations to remain one of the most spectacular and attractive buildings in Darwin.

On 17 December 1918, Government House became the focal point of political turmoil and union unrest against John Gilruth's administration. About 1000 demonstrators marched to Government House where they burnt an effigy of Gilruth and demanded his resignation. The incident became well known as the Darwin Rebellion.

Government House  was entered on the now-defunct Register of the National Estate on 14 May 1991 and was added to the Northern Territory Heritage Register on 19 March 1996.

Gallery

See also
Government Houses of Australia
 Government Houses in the Commonwealth
Administrators of the Northern Territory

References

External links

Government House Northern Territory website

Buildings and structures in Darwin, Northern Territory
Tourist attractions in Darwin, Northern Territory
Official residences in Australia
Darwin
Victorian architecture in Australia
Northern Territory Government
1878 establishments in Australia
Northern Territory Heritage Register
Northern Territory places listed on the defunct Register of the National Estate